Kneške Ravne is a dispersed settlement in the hills north of the Bača Valley in the Municipality of Tolmin in the Littoral region of Slovenia. It lies in the southern border area of Triglav National Park and is a popular starting point for hikes in the southwestern Julian Alps. The settlement has been part of the park since 2010.

Name
The name of the settlement was changed from Ravne to Kneške Ravne (literally, 'Kneža Ravne') in 1953, distinguishing it from nearby Tolminske Ravne (literally 'Tolmin Ravne') and similarly named settlements. The name Ravne is frequent in Slovenia and is adjectival in origin, resulting from ellipsis of the noun phrase ravne njive 'flat fields, level fields', referring to the local geography.

References

External links 
Kneške Ravne on Geopedia

Populated places in the Municipality of Tolmin